Worldwide is a studio album by The Death Set.

References

2016 albums